The Wrangling Lovers; Or, The Invisible Mistress is a 1676 comedy play by the English writer Edward Ravenscroft.

It premiered at the Dorset Garden Theatre, performed by the Duke's Company with a cast that included Anthony Leigh as Count de Benevent, William Smith as Don Diego de Sluniga, Matthew Medbourne as Don Ruis de Moncado, Henry Harris as Don Gusmun, Cave Underhill as  Sanco, Thomas Percival as Ordgano, Margaret Hughes as  Octavia, Elizabeth Barry as Elvira and Anne Shadwell as Beatrice.

References

Bibliography
 Canfield, J. Douglas. Tricksters and Estates: On the Ideology of Restoration Comedy. University Press of Kentucky, 2014.
 Van Lennep, W. The London Stage, 1660-1800: Volume One, 1660-1700. Southern Illinois University Press, 1960.

1676 plays
West End plays
Restoration comedy
Plays by Edward Ravenscroft